is a Japanese ice hockey player and member of the Japanese national team, currently playing with the Seibu Princess Rabbits in the Women's Japan Ice Hockey League (WJIHL) and the All-Japan Women's Ice Hockey Championship.

Playing career
As a junior player with the Japanese national under-18 team, Koyama participated in three IIHF U18 Women's World Championship tournaments, playing in the Division I tournament in 2016, the Top Division tournament in 2017, and the Division I Group A tournament in 2018.

A member of the senior national team since 2018, she represented Japan at the IIHF Women's World Championship in 2018, 2019 and 2022. She also participated in the women's ice hockey tournament at the 2022 Winter Olympics in Beijing, recording an assist in five games played.

Koyama won a silver medal with Team Japan in the women's ice hockey tournament at the 2023 Winter World University Games in Lake Placid, New York, ranking second in team scoring with 3 goals and 3 assists for 6 points in seven games.

Personal life

, Koyama is a student at Waseda University in Shinjuku, Tokyo, Japan.

References

External links
 
 

2000 births
Living people
Japanese women's ice hockey forwards
Ice hockey players at the 2022 Winter Olympics
Medalists at the 2023 Winter World University Games
Olympic ice hockey players of Japan
Universiade medalists in ice hockey
Universiade silver medalists for Japan